This is a full list of Pyralidae genera.

Abachausia
Abaera
Abareia
Acallidia
Acallis
Accinctapubes
Achroia
Acolastodes
Acracona
Acritonia
Acrobasis
Acrobasopsis
Acroncosa
Actenia 
Acteniopsis
Actinocrates
Actrix
Acyperas
Adanarsa
Addyme
Adelosemia
Adelperga
Adelphia
Adenopteryx
Adulis
Afra
Africella
Afromyelois
Afromylea
Afropsipyla
Agastophanes
Aglossa
Aglossodes
Ahyalosticta
Alispoides
Alophia
Alphacrambus
Alpheias
Alpheioides
Ambesa
Ambetilia
Ambluncus
Amechedia
Amegarthria
Ammatucha
Amphiderita
Amphignostis
Amphithrix
Amyelois
Anacostia
Anactenia
Anadelosemia
Anaeglis
Anarnatula
Anassodes
Anchylobela
Ancova
Ancylodes
Ancylodinia
Ancylosis
Ancylosoma
Anderida
Anegcephalesis
Anemmalocera
Anemosa
Anemosella
Anephopteryx
Anerastia
Anerosoma
Anexophana
Anisothrix
Anjumania
Anobostra
Anonaepestis
Anoristia
Anthopteryx
Antiptilotis
Antisindris
Anypsipyla
Aphomia
Aphycita
Aphyletes
Apocera
Apodentinodia
Apomyelois
Aprophthasia
Aptunga
Araeopaschia
Arbinia
Archiephestia
Archigalleria
Arctioblepsis
Ardekania
Ardekanopsis
Ardjuna
Area
Arenipses
Arescoptera
Arica
Arimania
Arispe
Arivaca
Arouva
Arsenaria
Arsissa
Arta
Asalebria
Asaluria
Asarta
Asartodes
Asclerobia
Asemeia
Aspithroides
Assara
Astrapometis
Atascosa
Athaliptis
Atheloca
Atopothoures
Auchmera
Audeoudia
Aurana
Australephestiodes
Austropaschia
Autocyrota
Auxacia
Azaera
Azamora
Azanicola
Bahiria
Balanomis
Balidarcha
Bandera
Bapara
Baptotropa
Barberia
Barbifrontia
Basacallis
Bazaria
Belutschistania
Bema
Benderia
Berastagia
Bertelia
Bethulia
Betsimisaraka
Bibasilaris
Birinus
Bisinusia
Blepharocerus
Boeswarthia
Bonchis
Borosia
Bostra
Brachiolodes
Bradypodicola
Bradypophila
Bradyrrhoa
Burgeonidea
Cabnia
Cabotella
Cacotherapia
Cacozelia
Cacozophera
Cactoblastis
Cadra
Cahela
Caina
Calamotropa
Calamotropodes
Calguia
Callasopia
Callionyma
Calybitia
Candiopella
Canthelea
Cantheleamima
Caphys
Cappsia
Caradjaria
Carcha
Cardamyla
Caristanius
Carthade
Carthara
Cassiana
Casuaria
Cataclysta
Catadupa
Catalaodes
Catamola
Cataprosopus
Catastia
Cathayia
Cathyalia
Catocrocis
Catopyla
Caudellia
Caustella
Caviana
Cavipalpia
Cayennia
Cecidipta
Centrometopia
Ceracanthia
Ceratagra
Ceratothalama
Ceroprepes
Ceuthelea
Ceutholopha
Chararica
Cherchera
Chevalierella
Chilocremastis
Chloropaschia
Chorrera
Chortonoeca
Christophia
Chrysauge
Chrysophila
Chrysoscinia
Ciliocera
Ciliocerodes
Ciliopempelia
Citripestis
Clydonopteron
Cnephidia
Coenochroa
Coenodomus
Coenotropa
Coleocornutia
Coleothrix
Commotria
Comotia
Condylolomia
Conobathra
Copamyntis
Coptarthria
Corcyra
Cosmethella
Craftsia
Cremnophila
Creobota
Cristia
Crocalia
Crocidomera
Crocydopora
Cromarcha
Cryptadia
Cryptarthria
Cryptoblabes
Cryptomyelois
Cryptophycita
Cryptoses
Cryptozophera
Crystallozyga
Ctenarthria
Ctenomedes
Ctenomeristis
Culcitaria
Cuniberta
Cunibertoides
Curena
Cyclidalis
Cyclopalpia
Cyiza
Cyphita
Cyprusia
Dalakia
Daria
Dastira
Dasycnemia
Dasypyga
Dasyvesica
Dattinia
Davara
Dectocera
Delcina
Delogenes
Delopterus
Dembea
Dentitegumia
Deopteryx
Derbeta
Deuterollyta
Dialepta
Diatomocera
Didia
Difundella
Diloxia
Diloxis
Dinopleura
Dioryctria
Dipha
Dipsochares
Discofrontia
Discordia
Distortia
Ditrachyptera
Diviana
Divitiaca
Dolichomia
Doloessa
Dracaenura aegialitis
Drepanodia
Drescoma
Drescomopsis
Dysphylia
Ecbatania
Ecbletodes
Eccopidia
Eccopisa
Ecnomoneura
Ectohomoeosoma
Edulica
Elaealis
Elasmopalpus
Eldana
Elegia
Elisabethinia
Ematheudes
Embryoglossa
Emmalocera
Emporia
Endolasia
Endosimilis
Endotricha
Enosima
Entmemacornis
Epacternis
Ephedrophila
Ephestia
Ephestiodes
Ephestiopsis
Epichalcia
Epicrocis
Epidauria
Epidelia
Epiepischnia
Epilepia
Epimorius
Epiparachma
Epiparthia
Epipaschia
Epischidia
Epischnia
Epischnopsis
Episcythrastis
Epitamyra
Epizonora
Ereboenis
Erelieva
Ernophthora
Ertzica
Essina
Ethelontides
Ethiopsella
Ethopia
Etiella
Etielloides
Euageta
Eublemmodes
Eucampyla
Eucarphia
Eugyroptera
Eulogia
Eulophopalpia
Eulophota
Eumysia
Eupilocera
Eurhodope
Eurhophaea
Eurythmasis
Eurythmia
Eurythmidia
Euryzonella
Euzophera
Euzopherodes
Exodesis
Exuperius
Farnobia
Farsia
Fissicera
Flabellobasis
Fondoukia
Fossifrontia
Fregenia
Fulrada
Fundella
Gabinius
Galasa
Galasodes
Galleria
Gallerites
Gauna
Gennadius
Genopaschia
Genophantis
Gephyra
Gephyrella
Geropaschia
Getulia
Glendotricha
Glossopaschia
Glyphocystis
Glyptocera
Glyptoteles
Gnathomorpha
Gorama
Goya
Gozmanyia
Grammiphlebia
Gregorempista
Guastica
Gunungia
Gunungodes
Gymnancyla
Gymnancylodes
Hafisia
Hannemanneia
Hanreisseria
Haplosindris
Harnochina
Harraria
Hednotodes
Heinrichiessa
Heminomistis
Hemiptilocera
Hemiptiloceroides
Heras
Herculia
Hercynodes
Heterauge
Heterochrosis
Heterocrasa
Heteromicta
Hobohmia
Hoeneodes
Holoperas
Homodigma
Homoeographa
Homoeosoma
Homosassa
Homura
Honora
Honorinus
Horistarcha
Hosidia
Humiphila
Hyalosticta
Hyboloma
Hydaspia
Hylopercnas
Hylopylora
Hypanchyla
Hypargyria
Hyperparachma
Hypochalcia
Hypocosmia
Hypodaria
Hypolophota
Hyporatasa
Hypotia
Hypsipyla
Hypsopygia
Hypsotropa
Idiobrotis
Idnea
Idneodes
Ilithyia
Illatila
Imerina
Immyrla
Incarcha
Indocabnia
Indomalayia
Indomyrlaea
Insalebria
Interjectio
Irakia
Iraniodes
Isolopha
Itambe
Jacutscia
Jakuarte
Jocara
Kasyapa
Katja
Kaurava
Keradere
Khachia
Khorassania
Khuzistania
Kivia
Klimeschiola
Kumbhakarna
Lacalma
Laciempista
Lacipea
Laetilia
Lamacha
Lambaesia
Lameerea
Lamida
Lamoria
Larice
Laristania
Larodryas
Lascelina
Lasiosticha
Latagognoma
Laurentia
Leotropa
Lepidogma
Lepidomys
Lepipaschia
Leptoses
Letoa
Leviantenna
Lioprosopa
Lipographis
Lista
Locastra
Lophocera
Lophopleura
Lophopleuropsis
Lophothoracia
Loryma
Lorymana
Lorymodes
Lymphia
Macalla
Macna
Macrophycis
Macropyralis
Macrorrhinia
Macrovalva
Madiama
Magiria
Magiriamorpha
Magiriopsis
Makrania
Malgachinsula
Maliarpha
Mampava
Mapeta
Maricopa
Marionana
Marionodes
Marisba
Martia
Martiniodes
Mascelia
Maschalandra
Masthala
Mayaciella
Mazdacis
Meca
Mecistophylla
Medaniaria
Mediavia
Mediophycis
Megacaphys
Megacerdresa
Megalophota
Megalophycita
Megarthria
Megarthridia
Megasis
Melanalis
Melanastia
Melathrix
Menuthia
Merangiria
Meroptera
Merulempista
Mescinia
Mesciniadia
Mesciniodes
Mesodiphlebia
Mesosindris
Metacrateria
Metallosticha
Metallostichodes
Metaraphia
Metephestia
Metoecis
Metriostola
Meyriccia
Meyrickiella
Michaeliodes
Michaelshaffera
Microchlora
Micromastra
Micromescinia
Micromystix
Micronix
Micropaschia
Microphestia
Microphycita
Microrca
Microsauge
Microzancla
Mildrixia
Milgithea
Miliberta
Mimetauge
Mimicia
Mimopolyocha
Minooa
Mittonia
Moerbes
Monoctenocera
Monoloxis
Monoptilota
Monotonia
Moodna
Moodnodes
Moodnopsis
Murgisca
Mussidia
Myelodes
Myelois
Myeloisiphana
Myelopsis
Myelopsoides
Myolisa
Myrlaea
Nachaba
Nakurubia
Namibicola
Namibiopsis
Navasota
Navura
Nefundella
Negalasa
Neobostra
Neocaphys
Neocoristis
Neodavisia
Neoepimorius
Neopaschia
Neopempelia
Neophrida
Neorastia
Neorufalda
Neostriglina
Nephopterix
Nephopterygia
Nevacolima
Nhoabe
Nicetiodes
Niethammeriodes
Noctuides
Nonambesa
Nonia
Nonphycita
Nyctegretis
Nylonala
Obutobea
Ocala
Ocoba
Ocrasa
Ocresia
Ocrisiodes
Ocydina
Odontarthria
Odontopaschia
Oectoperodes
Oedilepia
Oedothmia
Oenogenes
Ogilvia
Oligochroa
Oligochroides
Olybria
Omphalepia
Omphalobasella
Omphalocera
Omphalomia
Omphalota
Oncocera
Oncolabis
Oneida
Ophias
Oreana
Ormuzdia
Orthaga
Ortholepis
Orthopygia
Orybina
Oryctocera
Oryctometopia
Oryctopleura
Osakia
Oxyalcia
Oxybia
Oxydisia
Pachypodistes
Paconius
Palloria
Palmia
Palmitia
Palpusopsis
Pandoflabella
Parabaera
Parachma
Parachmidia
Paractenia
Paraemporia
Paragalasa
Paraglossa
Paralaodamia
Paralipsa
Paramacna
Paramaxillaria
Paranatula
Paraphomia
Paraphycita
Pararotruda
Parasclerobia
Parasefidia
Parastericta
Paratascosa
Parazanclodes
Paridnea
Paroxyptera
Parramatta
Parthia
Passadena
Passelgis
Patagoniodes
Patna
Patriciola
Peadus
Pelasgis
Pempelia
Penetiana
Peniculimius
Penthesilea
Peoria
Peplochora
Perinetoides
Perisseretma
Persicoptera
Perula
Phestinia
Phidotricha
Philodema
Philosauritis
Philotis
Phobus
Phycita
Phycitodes
Phycitophila
Phycitopsis
Phylebria
Picrogama
Piesmopoda
Pima
Pimodes
Pionidia
Pirizania
Pirizanodes
Pithyllis
Plagoa
Platycrates
Pleurochila
Plodia
Plumiphora
Plutopaschia
Pococera
Pocopaschia
Pogononeura
Pogonotropha
Pogrima
Poliopaschia
Poliostola
Polopeustis
Polycampsis
Polylophota
Polyocha
Postemmalocera
Potosa
Praecomotia
Praedonula
Praeepischnia
Praekatja
Praerhinaphe
Praesaluria
Prasinoxena
Pretoria
Pristarthria
Pristocerella
Proancylosis
Procunea
Promylea
Prophtasia
Prorophora
Proropoca
Prosaris
Prosoeuzophera
Prosthenia
Protasia
Proteinia
Protoetiella
Protomoerbes
Protrichia
Psectrodes
Pseudacrobasis
Pseudarenipses
Pseudasopia
Pseudocabima
Pseudocabotia
Pseudocadra
Pseudoceroprepes
Pseudodavara
Pseudodivona
Pseudogetulia
Pseudographis
Pseudomegasis
Pseudophycita
Pseudopiesmopoda
Psoropristia
Psorosa
Psorosana
Psorosina
Psorosodes
Psorozophera
Pterothrixidia
Ptyobathra
Ptyomaxia
Ptyonocera
Pyla
Pylamorpha
Pyralestes
Pyralis
Pyralites
Pyralosis
Pyrauge
Pyraustodes
Quadraforma
Quadrischistis
Quasiexuperius
Quasipuer
Quasisalebria
Rabiria
Ragonotia
Rambutaneia
Ramosignathos
Ramphidium
Rampylla
Raphimetopus
Ratasa
Repetekiodes
Replicia
Restidia
Reynosa
Rhagea
Rhectophlebia
Rhinaphe
Rhinaphena
Rhinogradentia
Rhodochrysa
Rhodophaea
Rhynchephestia
Rhynchetera
Rhynchopaschia
Rhynchopselaphus
Rhynchopygia
Rhynchotosale
Ribua
Rioja
Roeseliodes
Rostripalpus
Rostrolaetilia
Rotrudosoma
Rucuma
Rufalda
Rumatha
Saborma
Sabormania
Sacada
Sacculocornutia
Salebria
Salebriacus
Salebriaria
Salebriodes
Salebriopsis
Salinaria
Salobrena
Saluria
Samaria
Samcova
Sandrabatis
Sanguesa
Sarasota
Sarata
Sarcistis
Sardzea
Satole
Scenedra
Scenidiopis
Schistoneura
Schistotheca
Schoutedenidea
Sciota
Sclerobia
Sclerobiodes
Scorylus
Scythrophanes
Seeboldia
Sefidia
Selagia
Selagiaforma
Selga
Sematoneura
Semnia
Sempronia
Sengania
Serrulacera
Setomigma
Shafferiessa
Shebania
Shirazia
Siboga
Sindris
Sineudonia
Singhalia
Sosipatra
Sparactica
Spatulipalpia
Spectrobates
Spectrotrota
Speiroceras
Sphinctocera
Sporophyla
Spurilaetilia
Stanempista
Statia
Staudingeria
Stemmatophora
Stenachroia
Steneromene
Stenopaschia
Stereobela
Stericta
Sthenobaea
Stomoclista
Strephomescinia
Streptopalpia
Stylobasis
Stylopalpia
Styphlorachis
Succadana
Sudania
Sudaniola
Sultania
Sybrida
Symphonistis
Synaphe
Synoria
Syntypica
Taboga
Tacoma
Taftania
Taiwanastrapometis
Tallula
Tampa
Tamraca
Tamyra
Tancoa
Tanyethira
Taprobania
Tarquitia
Tegulifera
Teleochytis
Telethusia
Teliphasa
Tenellopsis
Tephris
Termioptycha
Tetraschistis
Thalamorrhyncha
Tharsanthes
Thermopteryx
Thermotesia
Thiallela
Thopeutis
Thospia
Thylacoptila
Thyridopyralis
Tineopaschia
Tinerastia
Tinestra
Tippecoa
Tirathaba
Titanoceros
Tlascala
Toccolosida
Toripalpus
Tornocometis
Torotambe
Tosale
Tota
Trachonitis
Trachycera
Trachylepidia
Trachypteryx
Transcaspia
Trebania
Tretopteryx
Triaenoneura
Trichotophysa
Triozosneura
Triphassa
Trisides
Trissonca
Trychnocrana
Tsaraphycis
Tsaratanana
Tulsa
Tylochares
Tyndis
Ufa
Uliosoma
Ulophora
Ulotricha
Unadilla
Unadillides
Uncinus
Ungulopsis
Urbania
Vagobanta
Valdovecaria
Valva
Varneria
Veldticola
Verina
Vezina
Vietteia
Villiersoides
Vinicia
Vitessa
Vitessidia
Vitula
Vixsinusia
Voglia
Volatica
Volobilis
Wakulla
Welderella
Wunderia
Xantippe
Xantippides
Xenomilia
Xenophasma
Yxygodes
Zaboba
Zamagiria
Zamanna
Zanclodes
Zapalla
Zitha
Zonora
Zonula
Zophodia
Zophodiodes
Zynodes

References 

Pyralidae
 List